Following is an incomplete list of past and present Members of Parliament (MPs) of the United Kingdom whose surnames begin with P. The dates in parentheses are the periods for which they were MPs.

Richard Page
Lord Clarence Paget
James Paice
Ian Paisley
Nick Palmer
John Pardoe
Gilbert Parker
John Parker
John Parker
John Parker
John Parker
John Parker, 1st Baron Boringdon
Cecil Parkinson
Charles Cripps, 1st Baron Parmoor
 Matthew Parris (1979–1986)
Sidney James Webb, 1st Baron Passfield
Terry Patchett
Owen Paterson
Irvine Patnick
Chris Patten
John Patten, Baron Patten
Joseph Paxton
Ian Pearson
Charles Pearson, Lord Pearson
Fred Peart, Baron Peart
Joseph Pease (1832–1841)
Sir Joseph Pease, 1st Baronet (1865–1903)
Joseph Albert Pease, 1st Baron Gainford (1892–1917)
John Peel
Andrew Pelling
Tom Pendry, Baron Pendry
Isaac Penington
Mike Penning
John Penrose
Samuel Pepys
Algernon Percy, 6th Duke of Northumberland
Eustace Percy, 1st Baron Percy of Newcastle
Henry Percy
Henry Percy, 7th Duke of Northumberland
Linda Perham
Samuel Morton Peto
John Peyton
Mark Philips
Robert Needham Philips
 Marion Phillips
Eric Pickles
Colin Pickthall
Peter Pike
Phil Piratin
Bill Pitt
Thomas Pitt, 1st Earl of Londonderry
James Plaskitt
Leonard Plugge
Kerry Pollard
Chris Pond
Arthur Ponsonby, 1st Baron Ponsonby of Shulbrede
Vere Ponsonby, 9th Earl of Bessborough
Greg Pope
Stephen Pound
Enoch Powell
Ray Powell
Bridget Prentice
Gordon Prentice
Reginald Prentice
John Prescott
Dawn Primarolo
David Prior
James Prior, Baron Prior
Mark Prisk
Mark Pritchard
Harvey Proctor
Gwyn Prosser
John Pugh
A. A. Purcell
Ken Purchase
James Purnell

 P